The Kerala Legislative Assembly(ml:കേരള നിയമസഭ) more popularly known as Niyamasabha (meaning- hall of laws in Malayalam), is the law making body of Kerala, one of the 28 States in India. The Assembly is formed by 140 elected representatives and one nominated member from the Anglo-Indian community. Each elected member represents one of the 140 constituencies within the borders of Kerala and is referred to as Member of Legislative Assembly.

See also
 Kerala State legislative assembly election, 2011

References

 Legislators up to 2006

External links
 Kerala Assembly, Website
Election Database

Politics of Kerala

2006 establishments in India
Kerala MLAs 2006–2011

ml:കേരള നിയമസഭ